Dalby may refer to:

Places and jurisdictions

Australia
 Dalby, Queensland
 Borough of Dalby, a local government area for Dalby
 Town of Dalby, a local government area for Dalby

British Isles
Dalby, Isle of Man
Dalby, Lincolnshire
Great Dalby, Leicestershire
Old Dalby, Leicestershire
Dalby Preceptory, Leicestershire
Dalby-cum-Skewsby, North Yorkshire
Dalby Forest, North York Moors National Park

Denmark
 Dalby, Faxe Municipality

Sweden
 Dalby, Lund Municipality
 Diocese of Dalby, a predecessor to the Diocese of Lund

United States
 Dalby, Iowa
 Dalby Springs, Texas

Other uses 
 Dalby (surname), a surname (including a list of people with the name)